The cabinet of Tunisian Head of Government Mehdi Jomaa was approved on 29 January 2014. The cabinet consists of 21 ministries and 7 secretaries of state.

Cabinet members

References

Jomaa
Cabinets established in 2014
2014 establishments in Tunisia
2014 in Tunisian politics
2015 in Tunisian politics
Cabinets disestablished in 2015
2015 disestablishments in Tunisia